Bacteriophage (phage) are viruses of bacteria and arguably are the most numerous "organisms" on Earth. The history of phage study is captured, in part, in the books published on the topic. This is a list of over 100 monographs on or related to phages.

List of phage monographs (descending date order)

Books published in the 2010s

 Hyman, P., Abedon, S. T. 2018. Viruses of Microorganisms.  Google Books
 Abedon, S. T., García, P., Mullany, P., Aminov, R. 2017. Phage therapy: past, present and future.  Google Books
 Jassim, S.A.A., Limoges, R.G. 2017. Bacteriophages: Practical Applications for Nature's Biocontrol.  Google Books
 Dobretsov, N. T., 2018. Bacteriophages: The Enemies of Our Enemies as published as a special issue in Science First Hand consisting of nine articles.
 Rakonjac, J., Das, B. Derda, R. 2017.  Filamentous Bacteriophage in Bio/Nano/Technology, Bacterial Pathogenesis and Ecology.   Google Books
 Nicastro,J., Wong,S., Khazaei,Z., Lam,P., Blay,J., Slavcev,R.A. 2016. Bacteriophage Applications - Historical Perspective and Future Potential.   Google Books
 Allen, H. K., Abedon, S. T. 2015. Viral Ecology and Disturbances: Impact of Environmental Disruption on the Viruses of Microorganisms.  Google Books
 Wei, H. 2015. Phages and Therapy as published as a special issue in Virologica Sinica consisting of four reviews, three research articles, six letters, and one insight article.
 Weitz, J.S., 2015. Quantitative Viral Ecology: Dynamics of Viruses and Their Microbial Hosts. Princeton University Press, Princeton, NJ. . Google Books
 Borysowski, J., Międzybrodzki, R., Górski, A., eds. 2014. Phage Therapy: Current Research and Applications. Caister Academic Press, Norfolk, UK.  Google Books
 Hyman, P., Harrah, T. 2014. Bacteriophage Tail Fibers as a Basis for Structured Assemblies. Momentum Press/ASME, New York, NY.  Google Books
 Chanishvili, N. 2012. A Literature Review of the Practical Application of Bacteriophage Research. Nova Science Publishers, Hauppauge, New York.  Google Books
 Hyman, P., Abedon, S. T., eds. 2012. Bacteriophages in Health and Disease CABI Press, Wallingford, Oxfordshire, UK. , Google Books
 Abedon, S. T. 2011. Bacteriophages and Biofilms: Ecology, Phage Therapy, Plaques. Nova Science Publishers, Hauppauge, New York. Partial online version is also available, constituting effectively a "first edition". 
 Petrenko, V., Smith, G., eds. 2011. Phage Nanobiotechnology. RSC Publishing, Cambridge, UK. Scheduled for a June, 2011, publication. 
 Abedon, S. T., ed. 2010. The 'Nuts and Bolts' of Phage Therapy. a special issue of the journal, Current Pharmaceutical Biotechnology, consisting of six articles on phage therapy, plus an editorial.
 Carnazza, S., Guglielmino, S. eds. 2010. Phage Display As a Tool for Synthetic Biology. Nova Science Publishers, Hauppauge, New York. , Google Books
 Sabour, P. M., Griffiths, M. W., eds. 2010. Bacteriophages in the Control of Food- and Waterborne Pathogens.

Books published in the 2000s
 Adams, H. T., 2009. Contemporary Trends in Bacteriophage Research. Nova Science Publishers, Hauppauge, New York. , Google Books
 Chanishvili, N., Sharp, R. 2009. A Literature Review of the Practical Application of Bacteriophage Research. Additional information on this monograph can be found here. Copyright: Eliava Institute of Bacteriophage, Microbiology and Virology, Tbilisi, Georgia.
 Clokie M. R. J., Kropinski, A. M., eds. 2009. Bacteriophages: Methods and Protocols.Volume 1: Isolation, Characterization, and Interactions. Humana Press, Totowa, NJ. This monographs is described also as Methods in Molecular Biology, volume 501. , Google Books
 Clokie M. R. J., Kropinski, A. M., eds. 2009. Bacteriophages: Methods and Protocols.Volume 2: Molecular and Applied Aspects. Humana Press, Totowa, NJ. This monographs is described also as Methods in Molecular Biology, volume 502. , Google Books
 Abedon, S. T., ed. 2008. Bacteriophage Ecology: Population Growth, Evolution, and Impact of Bacterial Viruses. Cambridge University Press, Cambridge, UK. This monograph is described also as Advances in Molecular and Cellular Microbiology, volume 15. , Google Books
 Mc Grath, S. and van Sinderen, D., eds. 2007. Bacteriophage: Genetics and Molecular Biology. Caister Academic Press, Norfolk, UK. , Google Books
 Cairns, J., G. Stent, and J. D. Watson, eds. 2007. Phage and the Origins of Molecular Biology (40th anniversary edition). Cold Spring Harbor Laboratory Press, Cold Spring Harbor, NY.   
 Holmes, F. L., and W. C. Summers. 2006. Reconceiving the Gene: Seymour Benzer's Adventures in Phage Genetics. Yale University Press, New Haven, CT. OCLC 62342731, Google Books
 Wegrzyn, G., ed. 2006. Modern Bacteriophage Biology and Biotechnology. Research Signpost 37/661 (2), Fort PO, Trivandrum-695023, Kerala, India. , Google Books
 Calendar, R., and S. T. Abedon, eds. 2006. The Bacteriophages. 2nd edition. Oxford University Press, Oxford. Additional information associated with this monograph can be found here. OCLC 65192869, Google Books
 Häusler, T. 2006. Viruses vs. Superbugs: A Solution to the Antibiotic Crisis. Macmillan, London. OCLC 62804701, 
 Birge, E. A. 2006. Bacterial and Bacteriophage Genetics. Springer-Verlag, New York. OCLC 17838673, Google Books
 Catalano, C. E., ed. 2005. Viral Genome Packaging Machines: Genetics, Structure, and Mechanism. Landes Bioscience/Eurekah, Georgetown, TX; Kluwer Academic/Plenum Publishers, New York. OCLC 57731385, Google Books
 Kutter, E., and A. Sulakvelidze, eds. 2005. Bacteriophages: Biology and Application. CRC Press, Boca Raton, FL. OCLC 56880238, Google Books
 Sidhu, S. S. 2005. Phage Display In Biotechnology and Drug Discovery. CRC Press,  OCLC 60311940, Google Books
 Waldor, M. K., D. Friedman, and S. Adhya, eds. 2005. Phages: Their Role in Bacterial Pathogenesis and Biotechnology. ASM Press, Washington, DC. OCLC 57557385, Google Books
 Clackson, T., and H. B. Lowman. 2004. Phage Display: A Practical Approach. Oxford University Press, Oxford. OCLC 54904081, Google Books
 Ptashne, M. 2004. Genetic Switch: Phage Lambda Revisited. Cold Spring Harbor, New York, Cold Spring Harbor Laboratory Press. OCLC 54035585, Google Books
 Häusler, T. 2003. Gesund durch Viren — Ein Ausweg aus der Antibiotika-Krise. Piper, München, Germany. [German; Healthy through Viruses - A Way Out of the Antibiotic-Resistance Crisis] OCLC 53098607
 O'Brien, P. M., and R. Aitken. 2002. Antibody Phage Display: Methods and Protocols. Humana Press, Totawa, NJ. OCLC 50175105, Google Books
 Peyrieras, N., and M. Morange. 2002. Travaux scientifiques de François Jacob. Odile Jacob, Paris. [French; The scientific works of François Jacob] OCLC 49567654
 Burton, D. R., J. K. Scott, G. J. Silverman, and C. F. Barbas. 2001. Phage Display: A Laboratory Manual. Cold Spring Harbor Laboratory Press, Cold Spring Harbor, NY. OCLC 43903550, 
 Birge, E. A. 2000. Bacterial and Bacteriophage Genetics. Springer-Verlag, New York. OCLC 41273243, 
 Stahl, F. W. 2000. We Can Sleep Later: Alfred D. Hershey and the Origins of Molecular Biology. Cold Spring Harbor Laboratory Press, Cold Spring Harbor, NY. OCLC 43185885, Google Books

The following have not yet been sufficiently scrutinized to ascertain that they technically are books (e.g., are not theses), are generally available, or are sufficiently about phages to be included in the above list:
 Rasool, S. A. 2002. Bacterial Viruses: Basic and Applied Concepts. University Grants Commission, Islamabad. OCLC 62340547
 Jia, P. X. 2001. Molecular Biology of Bacteriophage. Science Press, Beijing. OCLC ???
 Kutter, E. 2001. Phage Therapy: Bacteriophage as Natural, Self-limiting Antibiotics. AstraZeneca Research Foundation India, India. OCLC ???,

Books published in the 1990s

 Summers, W. C. 1999. Felix d'Herelle and the Origins of Molecular Biology. Yale University Press, New Haven, CT.
 Kay, B. K., J. Winter, and J. McCafferty. 1996. Phage Display of Peptides and Proteins: A Laboratory Manual. Academic Press, San Diego, CA. OCLC 34409484, 
 Rothman-Denes, L., and R. Weisberg. 1995. Recent developments in bacteriophage virology. Academic Press, London. OCLC 34099713
 Birge, E. A. 1994. Bacterial and Bacteriophage Genetics. Springer-Verlag, New York. OCLC 29791890, 
 Jacob, F. 1995. The Statue Within: An Autobiography. Cold Spring Harbor Laboratory Press, Cold Spring Harbor, New York. OCLC 17353378, 
 Karam, J. D. et al. 1994. Molecular Biology of Bacteriophage T4. ASM Press, Washington, DC. OCLC 30028892, 
 Twort, A. 1993. In Focus, Out of Step: A Biography of Frederick William Twort F.R.S. 1877-1950. Sutton Publishing, Thrupp, Stroud; Phoenix Mill, Gloucestershire, UK. OCLC 28025779, 
 Klaus, S., W. Krüger, and J. Meyer. 1992. Bakterienviren. Gustav Fischer, Stuttgart. [German; Bacterial Viruses] 
 Ptashne, M. 1992. A Genetic Switch: Phage Lambda and Higher Organisms. Blackwell, Cambridge, MA. OCLC 25713934, Google Books
 Cairns, J., G. Stent, and J. D. Watson. 1992. Phage and the Origins of Molecular Biology (expanded edition). Cold Spring Harbor Laboratory Press, Cold Spring Harbor, NY. OCLC 25872929
 He, N.-B., Z.-T. Si, and M.-X. Yu. 1991. Bacteriophage Images [Chinese]. Science Press, Beijing.

The following have not yet been sufficiently scrutinized to ascertain that they technically are books (e.g., are not theses), are generally available, or are sufficiently about phages to be included in the above list:
 Anonymous. 1991. Practical Phage Control. International Dairy Federation, Brussels.
 van Helvoort, T. 1993. Research Styles in Virus Studies in the Twentieth Century: Controversies and the Formation of Consensus. Doctoral Thesis, University of Limburg. (note that though this is a thesis, it is of sufficient general interest toward addressing issues in the history of bacteriophagy as to warrant inclusion in this list)

Books published in the 1980s

 Birge, E. A. 1988. Bacterial and Bacteriophage Genetics: An Introduction. Springer-Verlag, New York. OCLC 17838673, 
 Hobom, G., and R. Rott, eds. 1988. The Molecular Biology of Bacterial Virus Systems. Current Topics in Microbiology and Immunology, Volume 136. Springer-Verlag, Berlin. OCLC 18590320, 
 Jacob, F. 1988. The Statue Within: An Autobiography. Basic Books, New York. OCLC 17353378, 
 Jacob, F. La Statue intérieure [French: The Statue Within]. Editions Odile Jacob, Paris
 Fischer, E. P., and C. Lipson. 1988. Thinking About Science: Max Delbrück and the Origins of Molecular Biology. W.W. Norton & Co., New York. OCLC 16277429, 
 Calendar, R. 1988. The Bacteriophages. Volume I Plenum Press, New York. OCLC 18686137
 Calendar, R. 1988. The Bacteriophages. Volume II Plenum Press, New York. OCLC 17675040
 Goyal, S. M., C. P. Gerba, and G. Bitton. 1987. Phage Ecology. CRC Press, Boca Raton, Florida. OCLC 15654933, 
 Symonds, N., A. Toussaint, P. van de Putte, and W. V. Howe. 1987. Phage Mu. Cold Spring Harbor Press, Cold Spring Harbor, N.Y. OCLC 16089280, 
 Ackermann, H.-W., and M. S. DuBow. 1987. Viruses of Prokaryotes, Volume 1, General Properties of Bacteriophages. CRC Press, Boca Raton, Florida. OCLC 15518646, 
 Ackermann, H.-W., and M. S. DuBow. 1987. Viruses of Prokaryotes, Volume 2, Natural Groups of Bacteriophages. CRC Press, Boca Raton, Florida. OCLC ???, 
 Ptashne, M. 1986. A Genetic Switch: Gene Control and Phage ?. Blackwell, Cambridge, MA. OCLC 14719427, 
 Mendzhul, M. I. 1985. Tsianofagi: Virusy Tsianobakterii. Nauk. dumka, Kiev. [Russian; Cyanophages] OCLC 16131273
 Luria, S. E. 1984. A Slot Machine, a Broken Test Tube: An Autobiography. Harper & Row, Publishers, New York. OCLC 9758798,  (1985 paperback )
 Lin, E. C. C., R. Goldstein, and M. Syvanen. 1984. Bacteria, Plasmids, and Phages: An Introduction to Molecular Biology. Harvard University Press, Cambridge, MA . OCLC 10182998, 
 Mathews, C. K., E. M. Kutter, G. Mosig, and P. B. Berget. 1983. Bacteriophage T4. American Society for Microbiology, Washington, DC. OCLC 9622410, 
 Hendrix, R. W., J. W. Roberts, F. W. Stahl, and R. A. Weisberg. 1983. Lambda II. Cold Spring Harbor Laboratory, Cold Spring Harbor, New York. OCLC 9556019, 
 Birge, E. A. 1981. Bacterial and Bacteriophage Genetics: An Introduction. Springer-Verlag, New York. OCLC 7248504, ASIN B000ICBYWI
 DuBow, M. 1981. Bacteriophage Assembly: Proceedings of the Seventh Biennial Conference on Bacteriophage Assembly, Asilomar, California, September 14–17, 1980. A.R. Liss, New York. OCLC 7555738, 
 Randall, L. L., and L. Philipson. 1980. Virus Receptors part 1 Bacterial Viruses. Chapman and Hall, London and New York. OCLC 8409813

The following have not yet been sufficiently scrutinized to ascertain that they technically are books (e.g., are not theses), are generally available, or are sufficiently about phages to be included in the above list:
 Smith-Keary, P. F. 1988. Genetic Elements in Escherichia coli. MacMillan Education Ltd., London. OCLC ???, 
 Sorber, C. A., and S. W. Funderburg. 1983. Bacteriophages as Indicators of Human Enteric Viruses in Activated Sludge Wastewater Treatment. Univ of Texas at Austin Center. OCLC ???, 
 ??? 1983. Cloning with Bacteriophage. ???, ??? OCLC ???
 ??? 1982. Bakteriofagi: Sbornik Nauchnykh Trudov. ???, ??? [language; title in English] OCLC 18836533
 Desjardins, P. R., and G. B. Olson. 1983. Viral Control of Nuisance Cyanobacteria (Blue-Green Algae). II. Cyanophage Strains, Stability on Phages and Hosts, and Effects of Environmental Factors on Phage-Host Interactions. California Water Resource Center, University of California, Davis, CA. OCLC ???

Books published in the 1970s

 Ratner, V.A., ed. 1979. Matematicheskie Modeli Molekuliyarno-Geneticheskikh Sistem Upravleniya.  [Russian; Mathematical Models of Molecular Genetic Regulatory Systems]. Ed. Akad. Nauk SSSR, Novosibirsk, Sbornik Nauchnykh Trudov, Moscow. OCLC 7733759
 Stahl, F. W. 1979. Genetic Recombination: Thinking About it in Phage and Fungi. W.H. Freeman, San Francisco. OCLC 4956846, 
 Pulverer, G., P. B. Heczko, and G. Peters. 1979. Phage-Typing of Coagulase-Negative Staphylococci: Proceedings of the 1st International Conference, Cologne, September 16–18, 1977. G. Fischer, Stuttgart. OCLC 5105577
 Denhardt, D. T., D. Dressler, and D. S. Ray. 1978. The Single-Stranded DNA Phages. Cold Spring Harbor Laboratory, Cold Spring Harbor, NY. OCLC 4491528, 
 Fraenkel-Conrat, H., and R. R. Wagner. 1977. Comprehensive Virology: Reproduction of Bacterial DNA Viruses. Plenum Press, New York. OCLC 2331482, Google Books
 Primrose, S. B. 1976. Bacterial Transduction. Meadowfield Press Ltd., Durham, England. OCLC 3857517, 
 Winkler, U., W. Rüger, and W. Wackernagel. 1976. Bacterial, Phage and Molecular Genetics. An Experimental Course, 2nd ed. Springer, Berlin. OCLC 2121428, 
 Douglas, J. 1975. Bacteriophages. p. 77-133. Chapman and Hall, London. OCLC 1176725
 Zinder, N. D. 1975. RNA Phages. Cold Spring Harbor Laboratory, Cold Spring Harbor, NY. OCLC 1582488, 
 Buczowski, Z., and H. Rische. 1974. Lysotypie und andere spezielle epidemiologische Laboratoriumsmethoden. [German & English; Phage Typing and Other Special Epidemiological Laboratory Methods]. Gustav-Fischer-Verlag, Jena, Germany. OCLC 14423391
 Gasser, F. 1974. Microbiologie générale, Volume 1. Bactéries et Bactériophages. [French; Bacteria and Bacteriophages]. Ediscience, /McGraw-Hill, Paris OCLC ???
 King, R. C. 1974. Handbook of Genetics: Bacteria, Bacteriophages, and Fungi. Plenum Press, New York. OCLC 914857, 
 Krzywy, T., and S. Slopek. 1974. Morfologia i ultrastruktura bakteriofagów Shigella i Klebsiella. Polish Medical Publishers, Warsaw. [Polish; Morphology and Ultrastructure of Shigella and Klebsiella bacteriophages] OCLC 6943982
 Champe, S. P. 1974. Phage. Dowden, Hutchinson & Ross, Stroudsburg, PA. OCLC 980240
 Dalton, A. J., and F. Haguenau. 1973. Ultrastructure of Animal Viruses and Bacteriophages. An Atlas. Academic Press, New York. OCLC 762216, ASIN B0006C4EEA
 Poglazov, B. F. 1973. Morphogenesis of T-Even Bacteriophages. Monographs in Developmental Biology, Volume 7, ed.-in-chief A. Wolsky. S. Karger, New York. OCLC ???, 
 Winkler, U., W. Rüger and W. Wackernagel. 1972. Bakterien-, Phagen- und Molekulargenetik. [German; Bacterial, Phage and Molecular Genetics]. Springer, Berlin
 Mathews, C. K. 1971. Bacteriophage Biochemistry. Van Nostrand Reinhold Co., New York. OCLC 136326, 
 Hershey, A. D. 1971. The Bacteriophage Lambda. Cold Spring Harbor Laboratory,  OCLC 220264
 Snustad, D. P., and D. S. Dean. 1971. Genetics Experiments with Bacterial Viruses. W. H. Freeman and Co., San Francisco. OCLC 333991, 
 Tomizawa, J. -I., ed. 1971. Virulent Phage (Selected Papers in Biochemistry, Volume 1). University of Tokyo Press, Tokyo, and University Park Press, Baltimore, MD. OCLC 208390, 
 Tomizawa, J.-I., ed. 1971. Bacterial Genetics and Temperate Phage (Selected Papers in Biochemistry, Volume 2). University Park Press, Baltimore, MD.  OCLC 200390, 
 Hayes, W. 1970. The Genetics of Bacteria and their Viruses: Studies in Basic Genetics and Molecular Biology. Wiley, New York. OCLC 4655740, ASIN B000H5C8WG
 Juhasz, S. E., and G. Plummer. 1970. Host-Virus Relationships in Mycobacterium, Nocardia and Actinomyces. Charles C. Thomas, publisher, Springfield, Illinois. OCLC 113345, Google Books or Google Books
 Gabrilovitch I. 1970. Lysogeniya [Russian;Lysogeny]. Izdadelstvo Belarus, Minsk, Belarus
 Tikhonenko, A. S. 1970. Ultrastructure of Bacterial Viruses. Plenum Press, New York. OCLC 14492588, 

The following have not yet been sufficiently scrutinized to ascertain that they technically are books (e.g., are not theses), are generally available, or are sufficiently about phages to be included in the above list:
 Desjardins, P. R., M. B. Barkley, S. A. Swiecki, and S. N. West. 1978. Viral Control of blue-green algae. California Water Resource Center, University of California,  OCLC ???
 ??? 1978. Bakteriofagi i Ikh Ispol'zovanie v Veterinarnoi Praktike. ???, ??? [Russian; Bacteriophages and Their Utilization in Veterinary Practice] OCLC 4111249
 ??? 1977. Gene Expression V. 3 Plasmids and Phages. ???, ??? OCLC 13187199
 ??? 1972. Saikin Faji Iden Jikkenho. ???, ??? [Japanese; Experimental Methods in Bacteriophage Genetics] OCLC 14420642

Books published in the 1960s
 Gabrilovitch IM. 1968. Bakteriophage techniques [Russian]. Izdadelstvo Vychzyshaya Shkola, Minsk, Belarus
 Hayes, W. 1968. The Genetics of Bacteria and their Viruses. Wiley, New York. OCLC 5628
 Tikhonenko, A. S. 1968. Ultrastruktura Virusov Bakterii. [Russian; Ultrastructure of Bacterial Viruses]. Izdadelstvo "Nauka", Moscow. OCLC 14492588
 Raettig, H. 1967. Bakteriophagie 1957-1965 (Bacteriophagy 1957-1965). G. Fischer, Stuttgart. [German and English] OCLC 14503598
 Raiga, A. 1967. El Bacteriofago de d'Herelle. Universidad Nacional Autónoma de México. [Spanish translation of French "Le Bacteriophage de d'Herelle", Revue Philosophique de la France et l'Etranger, 4, octobre-diciembre, 1961.] 40 pages. OCLC: 6307317
 Cairns, J., G. Stent, and J. D. Watson. 1966. Phage and the Origins of Molecular Biology. Cold Spring Harbor Laboratory Press, Cold Spring Harbor, NY. OCLC 712215
 Stent, G. S. 1965. Molekulyarnaya Biologiya Virusov Bakterii. [Russian; Molecular Biology of Bacterial Viruses]. Izdadelstvo "MIR", Moscow. OCLC 55892813
 Gani, J. 1965. Stochastic Models For Bacteriophage. Methuen & Co. Ltd., London. OCLC 279694
 Hayes, W., 1964. The Genetics of Bacteria and their Viruses. Wiley, New York. OCLC 559954
 Stent, G. S. 1963. Molecular Biology of Bacterial Viruses. WH Freeman and Co., San Francisco, CA. OCLC 268815
 Geissler, E. 1962. Bakteriophagen, Objekte der Modernen Genetik. Akademie-Verlag, Berlin. [German; Bacteriophages, Objects of the Modern Genetics] OCLC 14607452
 Pekhov, A. P. 1962. Elektronnomikroskopicheskoe issledovanie bakterii i fagov. ???, ??? [Russian; Electron Microscopic Study of Bacteria and Phage] OCLC 14607218
 Adams, M. H. and A S Kriviskiĭ. 1961. Bakteriofagi. Russian. Moskva, Izd-vo inostrannoĭ lit-ry. OCLC: 18358144
 Stent, G. S. 1960. Papers on Bacterial Viruses. Little, Brown and Co., Boston. OCLC 485853

Books published in the 1950s

 Adams, M. H. 1959. Bacteriophages. Interscience, New York. OCLC 326505
 Ho, N. B., Z. T. Si, and M. X. Yu. 1959. Bacteriophages from China. An Electron Microscopical Atlas. Science Press, Beijing. OCLC ???
 Hercik, F. 1959. Biophysik der Bakteriophagen. VEB Deutscher Verlag der Wissenschaften, Berlin. [German; Biophysics of Bacteriophages] OCLC 15258981
 Burnet, F. M., and W. M. Stanley. 1959. The Viruses: Biochemical, Biological and Biophysical Properties: Plant and Bacterial Viruses. Academic Press, New York. OCLC 326764
 Raettig, H. 1958. Bakteriophagie, 1917 bis 1956; Zugleich en Vorschlag zur Dokumentation Wissenschaftlicher Literatur. G. Fischer, Stuttgart. [German; Bacteriophagy 1917 to 1956; At the Same Time a suggestion on the Documentation of Scientific Literature] OCLC 4309311
 Terada, M. 1956. Studies on Bacterial Viruses. Naya Publishing Co., Tokyo. OCLC 1064505
 Jacob, F. 1954. Les bactéries lysogènes et la notion de provirus. Masson, Paris. [French; The Lysogenic Bacteria and the Concept of the Provirus] OCLC 5780525
 International Union of Biological Sciences. 1953. Le Bactériophage: Premier Colloque International. Institut Pasteur, Paris. [French; The Bacteriophage: First International Conference] OCLC 11662838
 Evans, E. A. 1952. Biochemical Studies of Bacterial Viruses. University of Chicago Press, Chicago. OCLC 3195879
 Hedén, C.-G. 1951. Studies of the infection of E. coli B with the bacteriophage T2.  Acta. Path. Microbiol. Scand. supplement 8:1-126. OCLC 14670314
 Lederberg, J. 1951. Papers in Microbial Genetics: Bacteria and Bacterial Viruses. University of Wisconsin Press, Madison. OCLC 2472829

The following have not yet been sufficiently scrutinized to ascertain that they technically are books (e.g., are not theses), are generally available, or are sufficiently about phages to be included in the above list:
 Sutin, I. A. 1958. Bakteriofagi i ikh primenenie v meditsinskoĭ praktike. Russian. OCLC 14614699
 ??? 1950. Biologicheskie Antiseptiki: Bakteriofagi, Antitela, Antibiotik. Russian. OCLC 14672517
 Adams, M. H., J. H. jr. Comroe, and E. H. Venning. 1950. Methods of Study of Bacterial Viruses. Year Book Publishers, Chicago. OCLC 67599839

Books published in the 1940s

 Hammarström, E. 1949. Phage-Typing of Shigella sonnei. Stockholm. OCLC 5140885
 Lilleengen, K. 1948. Typing of Salmonella typhimurium by means of bacteriophage. The Bacteriological Hygienical Department of the Royal Veterinary College, Stockholm. OCLC 14665054
 Steinmann, J. 1946. Le Bactériophage: Sa Nature et son Emploi Thérapeutique. K, Bâle. [French; The Bacteriophage: Its Nature and its Therapeutic Employment] OCLC 14735726
 Flu, P. C. 1946. The Bacteriophage: A Historical and Critical Survey of 25 Years Research. Universitaire Pers Leiden, Leiden. OCLC 14744384
 d'Hérelle, F., 1946. L’étude d’une maladie: Le Choléra. French. F. Rouge & Cie S. A., Lausanne.

The following have not yet been sufficiently scrutinized to ascertain that they technically are books (e.g., are not theses), are generally available, or are sufficiently about phages to be included in the above list:
 Durisić, M. 1948. Ultravirusi, rikecie i bakteriofagi. Croatian. Publisher: Beograd, Naucna knjiga. OCLC 14661068
 Zaeva, S.P. 1945. Anaerobnye Bakteriofagi. Russian. OCLC 14736765
 Raiga, A. 1941. Traitement des Plaies de Guerre par le Bactériophage de d'Hérelle . Legrand & Bertrand, Paris. [French; Treatment of the wounds of war by the bacteriophage of Hérelle] OCLC 14725592
 Tsulukidze, A.P. 1941. Experience of Use of Bacteriophages in the Conditions of War Traumatism. Russian? Gruzmedgiz, Tbilisi, Georgia.

Books published in the 1930s

 Northrop, J. H. 1939. Crystalline Enzymes. The Chemistry of Pepsin, Trypsin, and Bacteriophage. Columbia University Press, New York. OCLC 2387455
 d'Hérelle, F. 1938. Le Phénomène de la Guérison dans les Maladies Infectieuses. Masson et cie, Paris. [French; The Phenomenon of the Cure in the Infectious Diseases] OCLC 5784382
 d'Herelle, F. translated by G. Eliava. 1934, Bakteriofag i fenomen vyzdorovlenija, Tbilisi State University Press, Tbilisi, Georgia [Russian translation of French text published in 1938, The Phenomenon of the Cure in Infectious Diseases]. OCLC 163085972.
 d'Hérelle, F. 1933. Le Bactériophage et ses Applications Thérapeutiques. Doin, Paris. [French; The Bacteriophage and its Therapeutic Applications] OCLC 14749145
 Gardner, A. D. 1931. Microbes and Ultramicrobes: An Account of Bacteria, Viruses and the Bacteriophage. Methuen & Co. Ltd., London. OCLC 3180401
 d'Hérelle, F., and G. H. Smith. 1930. The Bacteriophage and its Clinical Application. p. 165-243. Charles C. Thomas, Publisher, Springfield, Illinois. OCLC 347451

The following have not yet been sufficiently scrutinized to ascertain that they technically are books (e.g., are not theses), are generally available, or are sufficiently about phages to be included in the above list:
 d'Hérelle, F. 1935. Bacteriophage and Phenomenon of Recovery. Russian. TSU Press, Tbilisi, Georgia

Books published in the 1920s

 d'Hérelle, F. 1929. Études sur le Choléra. Impr. A. Serafini, Alexandrie. [French; Studies on Asiatic Cholera] OCLC 15864352
 Schuurman, C. J. 1927. Der Bakteriophage, eine Ultramikrobe; das D'Herellesche Phänomen. Rohrmoser, Bonn. [German; The Bacteriophage, an Ultramicrobe: the D'Hérelle phenomenon] OCLC 14743783
 d'Hérelle, F. 1926. Le Bactériophage et son Comportement. Masson et Cie, Paris. [French; The Bacteriophage and its Behavior] OCLC 11981307
 d'Hérelle, F., and G. H. Smith. 1926. The Bacteriophage and Its Behavior. The Williams &Wilkins Co., Baltimore. OCLC 2394374
 Hauduroy, P. 1925. Le Bactériophage de d'Hérelle. Librairie Le François, Paris. [French; The Bacteriophage of d'Hérelle] OCLC 17294190
 d'Hérelle, F. 1924. Drie Voordrachten over het Verschijnsel der Bacteriophagie. J.B. Wolters, Groningen. [Dutch; Three presentations concerning the phenomenon of the bacteriophage] OCLC 17864544
 d'Hérelle, F., and G. H. Smith. 1924. Immunity in Natural Infectious Disease. Williams & Wilkins Co., Baltimore. OCLC 586303
 d'Hérelle, F. 1922. Der Bakteriophage und seine Bedeutung für die Immunität; nach einem erweiterten und verbesserten. F. Vieweg & Sohn, Braunschweig. [German; The Bacteriophage and its Meaning for Immunity: toward an extended and improved text of the author's translation] OCLC 36920828
 d'Hérelle, F. 1922. The Bacteriophage: Its Role in Immunity. Williams and Wilkins Co./Waverly Press, Baltimore. OCLC 14789160, ASIN B000H6G02O, B000H6EK2G, Google Books
 d'Hérelle, F. 1921. Le Bactériophage: Son Rôle dans l'Immunité. Masson et cie, Paris. [French; The Bacteriophage: Its Role in Immunity] OCLC 14794182

The following have not yet been sufficiently scrutinized to ascertain that they technically are books (e.g., are not theses), are generally available, or are sufficiently about phages to be included in the above list:
 d'Hérelle, F., R. H. Malone, and M. N. Lahiri. 1930. Studies on Asiatic Cholera. Thacker, Spink & Co., Calcutta. OCLC 25936856
 d'Hérelle, F. 1923. Les Défenses de l'Organisme. Flammarion, Paris. [French; The Defenses of the Organism] OCLC 11127665

References

Bacteriophages
Microbiology literature
Lists of publications in science